The Pamukkale Express is a passenger train operated daily by the Turkish State Railways between Eskişehir and Denizli.

The Pamukkale Express formerly operated as a night train between Haydarpaşa Terminal in İstanbul and Denizli, with through cars to Burdur and Isparta. In 2008 train service was suspended for seven years until being revived in 2015 as a day train on its current route.

References

External links

Named passenger trains of Turkey